Regina Ursula Minudri (May 9, 1937June 18, 2021) was an American librarian best known as an outspoken proponent for public libraries and library services to young people. She served as president of the American Library Association from 1986 to 1987.

Early life and education

Regina Minudri, known as Gina, was born in San Francisco on May 9, 1937.

Minudri earned a bachelor's degree from the San Francisco College for Women and received her Master of Library Science from the University of California, Berkeley in 1959.

Career

At the beginning of her career Minudri worked at a series of public libraries in Northern California, including at Menlo Park Public Library from 1959 to 1962, Santa Clara Library from 1962 to 1968, and as the assistant county librarian of Alameda County Library from 1972 to 1977. In 1977 she became director of the Berkeley Public Library, a position she held until her retirement in 1994. While head of Berkeley Public Library, Minudri worked towards the successful passage of four library tax measures to provide a steady stream of reliable funding for the library, as well as leading a successful campaign for a $49 million bond measure. She developed several community-focused organizations, including the Berkeley Tool Lending Library in 1979 as well as the Berkeley Information Network. Upon her retirement from Berkeley Public Library, the library's young adult room was named after Minudri.

In 1997 Minudri was elected as the acting chief of the San Francisco Public Library system. She served in the role of San Francisco City Librarian, receiving high praise for stabilizing the library's budget, hired a chief financial officer, and improving the morale at the library system. Minudri suffered a stroke in May 1999 that prevented her from continuing in the role.

She also taught as a lecturer for library schools of the University of California, Berkeley and San Jose State University.

Library leadership

Minudri served as president of the California Library Association in 1981, testifying on behalf of both public and academic libraries in the state legislature.

She became president of the American Library Association in 1986. Minudri campaigned for president on the issues of validating the ALA-accredited Master of Library Science and increasing the visibility of pay equity for librarians as a national issue, drawing on her experience of winning a special equity adjustment for Berkeley Public Library staff.

Awards and recognition

In 1974 Minudri received the American Library Association's Grolier Foundation Award for the promotion of reading by children and young people.

She was elected into the California Library Hall of Fame in 2012. The Hall of Fame recognition honored her work as an "outspoken proponent for public libraries."

The Regina U. Minudri Young Adult Scholarship is given annually by ALA to a master's student in library science who intends to work with young adults in public libraries.

Special projects
Young Adult Library Services Project - Underground Libraries Unlimited

Article: Library Swings With Mod Jazz, by Jeanne Powell 

Santa Clara Journal, Vol. 96, No. 51, Dec. 18, 1968

Psychedelic posters, rock and roll music and three young professional librarians who never say "Ssshh" are the friendly greeting one gets by venturing into the Federal Young Adult Library Services Project office, 1081 Monroe St.

The federally-funded, two-year demonstration project has been undertaken through the combined efforts of two library systems--the San Jose-Santa Clara-Sunnyvale Cooperative Library system and the Santa Clara Valley Library System. Residents from Mountain View to Gilroy are welcome. 

Young people aged 13 to 19 are now checking out books, posters and records. The project will be experimenting with collections and materials not traditionally used in public libraries--such as rock and roll records. 

Eventually the libraries are expected to circulate tools, typewriters, sports equipment, board games and 8mm films. 

MOSTLY PAPERBACKS

Books, almost exclusively paperbacks, are loaned on an honor system basis. The books are stamped with the following: "Supplied by Underground Libraries Unlimited--We hope you enjoy this material. When you finish with it, please bring it back or pass it on to a friend who might enjoy it."

When other circulating materials are signed out, the librarians require some kind of "simple identification" such as a student body card. 

Miss REGINA U. MINUDRI, project coordinator, describes the philosophy of the project: "The Undergrounds provide a relaxed, informal atmosphere where young people can meet, talk, listen to music, watch a movie, and just be themselves without worrying about making too much noise or disturbing anyone.

"We attempt to emphasize the positive approach and to avoid having too many no no's. The young adults have responded well to this technique and have devised methods of policing themselves." 

MESH SYSTEMS

Miss MINUDRI, who holds a masters degree in library sciences from the University of California at Berkeley, said the aim of the project is find out "how to mesh this system within the traditional library system."

She believes traditional libraries do not appeal to young adults because "young people are intimidated by their size...don't know where to go to find what they want and are afraid to ask...sometimes this just turns them off about libraries.

"Also, we have time to talk to them...there's no generation gap because we listen."

Later life and death

After her stroke, Minudri recuperated with the help of her partner, Carol Starr, and traveled widely in her retirement. She died in her home in Berkeley, California, on June 18, 2021.

References

1937 births
2021 deaths
American librarians
American women librarians
Presidents of the American Library Association
21st-century American women